The acid mantle is a very fine, slightly acidic film on the surface of human skin acting as a barrier to bacteria, viruses and other potential contaminants that might penetrate the skin.  Sebum is secreted by the sebaceous gland and when mixed with sweat becomes the acid mantle. Unlike the acid mantle on the skin’s surface, the viable epidermis (ie., layers below the stratum corneum) has a neutral pH around 7.0. The general assumption is that skin surface pH is on average between 5.0 and 6.0. However the pH of the skin’s acid mantle is a broad range that depends on the condition of the skin and other estimates deem the range to be between 4.5 and 6.5 as slightly acidic.  More recent research has challenged the proposed ranges. When healthy human skin has not had contact with skin products or water for extended periods it has been found to naturally return to acidity levels below that of 5.0. A value of 4.7 was considered to be the natural average and ideal. Some subjects within the standard deviation reached values as low as 4.3. The study subjects with a skin pH below 5.0 showed statistically significant less scaling, higher hydration levels, and had better resident flora presence than subjects with skin pH above 5.0; concluding that people with a natural pH below 5.0 have a better condition than individuals with skin at a naturally higher pH.

The acidic surface pH is an important determinant for the growth conditions of resident microflora (i.e. normally found on the skin). Human skin has a mutualistic symbiotic relationship with its microflora. The skin provides the right environmental condition for the resident flora and the resident flora in turn strengthen skin’s defence by prevention of the colonization of harmful bacteria as well as playing a role in the acidification of the skin. Using skincare products to alter the skin pH down to 4.0-4.5 kept the resident bacterial flora attached to the skin while using alkaline personal care products on the skin promoted their dispersal from the skin.

Since blood is slightly alkaline (7.4), pathogenic bacteria that become adapted to the pH of the skin and are able to reach internal tissues will encounter an environment to which they are less well adapted. This combination of acidic exterior and alkaline interior is one of the body's non-specific host defenses against bacterial pathogens.

References

Skin anatomy